PSase may refer to:
All-trans-phytoene synthase, an enzyme
Phytoene synthase, an enzyme